Lowell Thomas George (April 13, 1945 – June 29, 1979) was an American singer, songwriter, multi-instrumentalist, and record producer, who was the primary guitarist, vocalist, songwriter and founder/leader for the rock band Little Feat.

Early life
Lowell George was born in Hollywood, California, the son of Willard H. George, a furrier who raised chinchillas and supplied furs to the movie studios.

George's first instrument was the harmonica. At the age of six he appeared on Ted Mack's Original Amateur Hour performing a duet with his older brother, Hampton. As a student at Hollywood High School (where he first befriended future bandmate Paul Barrere and second wife Elizabeth Levy), he took up the flute in the school marching band and orchestra. He had already started to play Hampton's acoustic guitar at age 11, progressed to the electric guitar by his high school years, and later learned to play the saxophone, shakuhachi and sitar. During this period, George viewed the teen idol-oriented rock and roll of the era with contempt, instead favoring West Coast jazz and the soul jazz of Les McCann and Mose Allison. Following graduation in 1963, he briefly worked at a gas station (an experience that inspired such later songs as "Willin'") to support himself while studying art and art history at Los Angeles Valley College for two years.

Musical career

Early bands
Initially funded by the sale of his grandfather's stock, George's first band, The Factory, formed in 1965 and released at least one single on the Uni Records label, "Smile, Let Your Life Begin" (co-written by George). Members included future Little Feat drummer Richie Hayward (who replaced Dallas Taylor in September 1966); Martin Kibbee (a.k.a. Fred Martin), who would later co-write several Little Feat songs with George (including "Dixie Chicken" and "Rock and Roll Doctor"); and Warren Klein on guitar. Frank Zappa produced two tracks for the band, but they were not released until 1993 on the album Lightning-Rod Man, credited to Lowell George and The Factory. The band made an appearance on the 1960s sitcom F Troop as "The Bedbugs". They were also featured in an episode of Gomer Pyle, U.S.M.C., "Lost, the Colonel's Daughter" (season 3, episode 27). They appeared in the scene inside the A-Go-Go club, with their music playing loudly. They received credit at the end of the episode as The Factory' Lowell-Warren-Martin-Rich, Courtesy of Universal Records". Following the disbanding of The Factory, George briefly joined The Standells.

Zappa and The Mothers of Invention
In November 1968, George joined Zappa's Mothers of Invention as rhythm guitarist and nominal lead vocalist; he can be heard on Weasels Ripped My Flesh, Burnt Weeny Sandwich, You Can't Do That on Stage Anymore, Vol. 1, You Can't Do That on Stage Anymore, Vol. 4 and the first disc of You Can't Do That on Stage Anymore, Vol. 5. During this period, he absorbed Zappa's autocratic leadership style and avant garde-influenced conceptual/procedural-oriented compositional methods. He earned his first production credit (in conjunction with Zappa and Russ Titelman) on Permanent Damage, an album recorded by "groupie group" The GTOs. George later asserted that "he performed no real function in the band" and left the group in May 1969 under nebulous circumstances. GTOs member Pamela Des Barres has claimed that George was fired by Zappa for smoking marijuana, while George claimed at a 1975 Little Feat concert that he was fired because he "wrote a song ["Willin] about dope." On the other hand, biographer Mark Brend asserts that Zappa liked the song but thought there was no place for it in the Mothers' set; George himself alternatively claimed that "it was decided that I should leave and form a band" by mutual agreement. George also claimed to have played uncredited guitar on Hot Rats.

Little Feat

After leaving the Mothers of Invention, George invited a contingent of fellow musicians (including former Zappa bassist Roy Estrada, keyboardist Bill Payne, and drummer Richie Hayward) to form a new band, which they named Little Feat. George usually (but not always) played lead guitar and focused on slide guitar, but Ry Cooder played the slide on "Willin on the debut Little Feat album after George badly injured his hand while working on a powered model airplane, although George rerecorded some of his material and he played the rest of the slide work on the album. Mark Brend wrote that George's "use of compression defined his sound and gave him the means to play his extended melodic lines." George began playing slide with the casing of a Sears, Roebuck, and Co. Craftsman 13/16" spark plug socket wrench that was given to him by a friend—Steve, whom he had met from New Hampshire—rather than the traditional glass or steel finger tube. (Spark plugs came in two sizes at the time: 13/16" and, later, 5/8"; the former was universal during George's time.)

Little Feat signed to Warner Bros. Records through Zappa's efforts and their first album was Little Feat, produced by Russ Titelman, but it was not a commercial success and only sold 11,000 copies on initial release.

The follow-up album, Sailin' Shoes, produced by Ted Templeman, was the band's first record to feature cover artwork by Neon Park, but despite good reviews the album fared no better commercially.

Estrada left the band in 1972 to join Captain Beefheart's Magic Band as well as to get away from the pollution in Los Angeles and he was replaced on bass by Kenny Gradney. In addition, Little Feat expanded to a sextet by adding a second guitarist Paul Barrere and percussionist Sam Clayton, thus cementing the classic line-up, and they took on a New Orleans funk direction with their next album, Dixie Chicken, the first to be produced by George.

By the spring of 1976, Little Feat were touring North America opening for The Who.

Little Feat released several other studio albums in the 1970s, including Feats Don't Fail Me Now, The Last Record Album, and Time Loves a Hero. The group's 1978 live album Waiting for Columbus became their best-selling album to date. "Down on the Farm" was their last album to feature Lowell and it was released shortly after his death in 1979.

Tensions within the group, especially between George, Payne, and, to a lesser extent, Barrere regarding musical direction and leadership, led to Payne and Barrere's departure from the group in 1979 and the group's subsequent disbandment. In an interview with Bill Flanagan conducted 11 days before his death, George stated that he was keen to re-form Little Feat without Payne and Barrere in order to reassert his full control over the group.

Record production
George was also a producer, and produced the Grateful Dead's 1978 album Shakedown Street, as well as Little Feat's records and his own 1979 solo album Thanks, I'll Eat It Here; he also co-produced a couple of tracks on Valerie Carter's 1977 release Just A Stone's Throw Away. In 1977 he co-produced John Starling's debut solo album, Long Time Gone.

Session work
When not playing with Little Feat, George lent his talents as a session player to various artists, most frequently as a slide guitarist. He contributed to Barbara Keith's 1972 self-titled debut, John Cale's Paris 1919 (1973), Happy End's Happy End (1973), Bonnie Raitt's Takin' My Time (1973; "I Feel the Same" and "Guilty"), Harry Nilsson's Son of Schmilsson (1973; "Take 54"), James Taylor's Gorilla (1975; "Angry Blues"), The Meters' Rejuvenation (1974; "Just Kissed My Baby"), John Sebastian's Tarzana Kid (1974) and Jackson Browne's The Pretender (1976).

Along with The Meters, George's slide work features prominently on Robert Palmer's first solo studio album, Sneakin' Sally Through the Alley, recorded in New Orleans in 1974. A year later, Palmer's second album (Pressure Drop) was effectively produced by George, and Little Feat served as the core band on the sessions. However, Palmer kept the producer's credit because of a dispute between Island Records and Warner Brothers. Later CDs list Steve Smith as producer.

Health problems
George led an overindulgent lifestyle of binge eating, alcoholism and speedballs (heroin and cocaine mixed together), and he became morbidly obese in the last years of his life, weighing 308 pounds (140 kg).

Death
On June 15, 1979, George began a tour in support of his solo album, Thanks I'll Eat it Here. On June 29, the morning after an appearance at Washington, D.C.'s Lisner Auditorium, where the bulk of Waiting for Columbus had been recorded in 1977, George collapsed and died of a heart attack in his Arlington, Virginia, hotel room at the Twin Bridges Marriott. His heart attack was caused by an accidental heroin overdose. George's body was cremated in Washington, D.C., on August 2. His ashes were flown back to Los Angeles, where they were scattered from his fishing boat into the Pacific Ocean.

According to Fred Tackett, "We were driving down the New Jersey Turnpike in this bus and we stopped at this pizza joint off the highway. Everybody in the band shared a cheese pizza but Lowell bought a large pizza with everything on it, carried it to the back of the bus, and he ate the entire pizza by himself. He died two or three days later. So, when people ask me, 'What really killed Lowell?' I say, 'It was a pizza on the New Jersey Turnpike.

Posthumous tributes and cover songs

 A benefit concert for George's family was held on August 4, 1979, shortly after his death, at the Forum in Los Angeles, featuring Little Feat, Jackson Browne, Linda Ronstadt, Emmylou Harris, Bonnie Raitt, Nicolette Larson and others.
 The song "Ride Like the Wind" on the 1979 self-titled debut album by Christopher Cross was dedicated to George.
 Jackson Browne memorialized George in his song "Of Missing Persons", on his 1980 album Hold Out. The song was dedicated to George's daughter Inara George, who is part of the musical duo The Bird and the Bee. Browne described George as "the Orson Welles of rock".
 In 1983, the British poet Sean O'Brien included a poem "For Lowell George" in his collection The Indoor Park.
 In 1988, American rock band Van Halen covered "A Apolitical Blues" as the closing track for their album OU812.
 In 1997, the CD Rock-n-Roll Doctor – A Tribute To Lowell George was released featuring various artists performing versions of George's songs, including Jackson Browne, J. D. Souther, Bonnie Raitt, Eddie Money, Randy Newman, Keisuke Kuwata, and Inara George.
Chris and Rich Robinson covered "Roll Um Easy" on their 2007 album Brothers of a Feather: Live at the Roxy as well as covering "Willin as a B-side for their Croweology acoustic double album.
Kevin Breit included his song "Lowell" on the 2007 Sisters Euclid album Faith Cola as a tribute to George.
American jam band Phish played all the songs from Little Feat's double album Waiting for Columbus during their annual and traditional Halloween "Musical Costume" on October 31, 2010, in Atlantic City, New Jersey.
Arlen Roth recorded "Dixie Chicken" in tribute to George on his Slide Guitar Summit album with Lee Roy Parnell in 2013.
 Gregg Allman recorded "Willin for his album Southern Blood in 2017.
Joey Landreth of The Bros. Landreth released a collection of Lowell George and Little Feat covers entitled All That You Dream in 2021.

Personal life
Lowell met Susan Taylor (nickname Jonna) during his days with The Factory.  They had Lowell's first child, Forrest George, in March 1969.  George and his first wife, Pattie Price, had a son, Luke, in April 1970. They divorced, and he became involved with Elizabeth Levy.  They had a daughter, Inara George, in July 1974; the couple married in 1976. Inara is half of the musical duo The Bird and the Bee.

George was stepfather to Levy's son Jed Levy from her previous marriage to Tom Levy.

References

External links
 Little Feat website
 
 
 
 Lowell George interview, Guitar Player magazine 1976

American rock guitarists
American rock singers
American rock songwriters
American male singer-songwriters
American multi-instrumentalists
1945 births
1979 deaths
Record producers from California
American harmonica players
American rock saxophonists
American male saxophonists
American flautists
Rhythm guitarists
American rhythm and blues guitarists
American funk guitarists
American blues guitarists
American soul guitarists
American male guitarists
Lead guitarists
Slide guitarists
Sitar players
Little Feat members
The Mothers of Invention members
People from Hollywood, Los Angeles
Singers from Los Angeles
People from Topanga, California
Los Angeles Valley College people
20th-century American singers
American blues singers
Warner Records artists
American session musicians
Guitarists from Los Angeles
Cocaine-related deaths in Virginia
20th-century American guitarists
20th-century saxophonists
20th-century American male singers
Singer-songwriters from California
The Standells members
20th-century flautists